Everett Saylor (October 8, 1909, Dayton, Ohio – May 31, 1942, Cape Girardeau, Missouri) was an American racecar driver. A dirt track racing specialist, he competed in the 1941 Indianapolis 500. It was his only Championship Car race start. He was killed in a racing accident on the dirt track at Cape Girardeau.

Saylor was inducted into the National Sprint Car Hall of Fame in 2002.

Indy 500 results

References

External links

 

1909 births
1942 deaths
Burials in Ohio
Indianapolis 500 drivers
Racing drivers from Dayton, Ohio
Racing drivers who died while racing
Sports deaths in Missouri
National Sprint Car Hall of Fame inductees